New Hope River is a  long fifth-order tributary to the Haw River in Chatham County, North Carolina.  This river is now entirely flooded as part of B. Everett Jordan Lake.  All of the tributaries to the river are present as arms of the lake.  New Hope River contributes 21.8% of the total water discharge for the Haw River.

Variant names
According to the Geographic Names Information System, it has also been known historically as:  
 New Hope Creek
 New River
 New-hope Creek
 Newhope Creek

Course
New Hope River is formed at the confluence of New Hope Creek and Morgan Creek in the northern part of B. Everett Jordan Lake.  When it was a river it flowed south-southwest to the Haw River.

Watershed
New Hope River drains  of area, receives about 47.2 in/year of precipitation, and has a topographic wetness index of 451.04 and is about 49% forested.

See also
Parkers Creek (New Hope River tributary)

References

Rivers of North Carolina
Rivers of Chatham County, North Carolina